Igor Shkvyrin (born 29 April 1963 in Tashkent) is a retired Uzbekistani professional footballer who played for several clubs in Europe and Asia and the Uzbekistan national football team. He was most recently the head coach of Sogdiana Jizzakh.

Playing career 
He played several seasons in the Soviet Top League with FC Pakhtakor Tashkent and moved to Israel where he played for Hapoel Tel Aviv F.C. and Malaysia where he played for Pahang FA. With Pahang, he won the 1995 Liga Perdana. With Pakhtakor, he scored 51 goals in 67 league matches between 1989 and 1991. He scored totally 275 goals in career and is member of Club 200 of Berador Abduraimov.

In 1999–00 season, Shkvyrin appeared in the National Football League with Mohun Bagan AC, and scored 11 goals. He emerged as the top scorer in the league that season. Later he moved to another Indian outfit Churchill Brothers SC and played in the 2000–2001 season. He scored 12 goals for the Red Machine and won the Durand Cup in 2001.

The 1994 Asian Games gold medallist Shkvyrin returned to Uzbekistan at the end of the season, and would eventually rack up five separate stints for Pakhtakor Tashkent before finally hanging up his boots at the age of 38 in 2001.

International career
Shkyrin made his debut for Uzbekistan on 17 June 1992 against Tajikistan in a 2-2 draw match, where he scored his first international goal.

He made 31 appearances for the Uzbekistan national football team and scored 20 goals between 1992 and 2000. He played in the 1994 Asian Games football tournament in Hiroshima, Japan (the first time Uzbekistan national team participated in an official football tournament following its independence from the Soviet Union, and the team won the gold medal).

Managing career
In 2002, he began managing career and worked in 2003–04 as assistant coach to Aleksandr Tarkhanov in FC Krylia Sovetov Samara.
From 2005 to 2007 he was head coach of Uzbek League club Qizilqum Zarafshon. In 2007, he was appointed as assistant coach to Vadim Abramov for Uzbekistan U-23 national team and in 2008–2010 worked as co-trainer to Rauf Inileev and later Mirjalol Kasymov for Uzbekistan national team.

Since 2008 he is head coach of Olmaliq FK. In season 2009 Olmaliq finished fourth in the league and Shkvyrin was named Football coach of the Year.

Honours

Club
Pahang FA
 Malaysia Super League champion: 1995
Pakhtakor Tashkent
 Uzbek League champion: 1998
 Uzbek League runners-up: 2001
 Uzbek Cup: 2001
Mohun Bagan AC
 National Football League (India) champion: 1999-2000
Churchill Brothers
 Durand Cup: 2001

International
 Asian Games champion: 1994

Individual
 Soviet First League Topscorer: 1990 (37 goals)
 National Football League (India) Golden Boot: 1999–00 (11 goals)
 Uzbek League Topscorer: 1998 (22 goals)
 Club 200 of Berador Abduraimov member: 275 goals
 Uzbekistan Player of the Year: 1994
 Best Player and Topscorer of Asian Games 1994: 8 goals (7 matches)

Manager
 Uzbek League 4th place: 2009
 Uzbekistan Football Coach of the Year: 2009
 UzPFL Coach of the Month (1): March 2015

Career statistics

See also
 Uzbekistan Footballer of the Year

References

External links
 
 
 Igor Shkvyrin at Footballdatabase

1963 births
Living people
Soviet footballers
Uzbekistani footballers
Uzbekistan international footballers
1996 AFC Asian Cup players
2000 AFC Asian Cup players
Hapoel Tel Aviv F.C. players
Maccabi Netanya F.C. players
Maccabi Herzliya F.C. players
Maccabi Petah Tikva F.C. players
Maccabi Jaffa F.C. players
FC Spartak Vladikavkaz players
Pakhtakor Tashkent FK players
FC Dnipro players
FC Karpaty Lviv players
Sri Pahang FC players
Uzbekistani expatriate sportspeople in India
Expatriate footballers in India
Expatriate footballers in Israel
Expatriate footballers in Malaysia
Churchill Brothers FC Goa players
Soviet Top League players
Soviet First League players
Russian Premier League players
Uzbekistani expatriate sportspeople in Israel
Uzbekistani expatriate sportspeople in Malaysia
Uzbekistani people of Russian descent
Asian Games medalists in football
Footballers at the 1994 Asian Games
Footballers at the 1998 Asian Games
Asian Games gold medalists for Uzbekistan
Association football forwards
Medalists at the 1994 Asian Games
National Football League (India) players
Bnei Yehuda Tel Aviv F.C. players
Mohun Bagan AC players
Expatriate footballers in Russia
Uzbekistani football managers
Sogdiana Jizzakh managers